Costus osae is a rare member of the Costus family. One of many rare tropical plants in the Costus family, Costus osae is a species native to Costa Rica described in 1997 . It has also been reported from Colombia.

This plant has thick stems with large green fuzzy leaves. It grows to an average height of about four feet and produces thick clusters of bright red bracts. It is rare as a garden plant or houseplant in the United States and it is speculated to be hardy in zones 9–10.

References

osae
Flora of Costa Rica
Flora of Colombia
Plants described in 1997